Pydi-bhimavaram is a village located in Ranastalam mandal in Srikakulam district, Andhra Pradesh, India.

In the 2011 census it had a population of 3444 in 870 households.

References

Villages in Srikakulam district

In this village there are three government schools and two private schools